Cliff Hatfield Memorial Airport  is a city-owned, public-use airport located one nautical mile (2 km) northwest of the central business district of Calipatria, a city in Imperial County, California, United States.

Facilities and aircraft 

Cliff Hatfield Memorial Airport covers an area of 200 acres (81 ha) at an elevation of 182 feet 55 m) below mean sea level. It has one runway designated 8/26 with an asphalt surface measuring 3,423 by 50 feet (1,043 x 15 m). For the 12-month period ending December 30, 2010, the airport had 1,300 general aviation aircraft operations, an average of 108 per month.

See also 
 
 
 List of airports in California

References

External links
 Aerial image as of May 2002 from USGS The National Map
 

Airports in Imperial County, California